Magdalena Matysiewicz better known as Magdalena Mazur (born 26 May 1976 in Katowice) is a Polish television presenter and model. She has acted in the comedy series  Daleko od noszy. She has also hosted the erotic show Różowa landrynka on TV Polsat and the show "Szał ciał" on MTV Poland.

References

1976 births
Polish television presenters
Polish female models
Living people
People from Katowice
Polish women television presenters